Harry Frieda (September 11, 1901 – August 20, 1983) was an American athlete. He competed in the men's decathlon at the 1924 Summer Olympics.

References

External links
 

1901 births
1983 deaths
Athletes (track and field) at the 1924 Summer Olympics
American male decathletes
Olympic track and field athletes of the United States
People from White County, Indiana
Olympic decathletes